Joseph Binns, CBE (19 March 1900 – 23 April 1975) was a British Labour Party politician.

Binns was the son of Alderman Joseph Binns, who later became Lord Mayor of Manchester. He was educated at elementary schools and at Manchester College of Technology, and became a consulting engineer, working for ICI.

He was a member of Greenwich Borough Council from 1932 to 1949, and was Chairman of the Joint Standing Committee of the Metropolitan Boroughs from 1945 to 1949. At the 1945 general election he was elected as the Member of Parliament (MP) for Gillingham in Kent. He was Parliamentary Private Secretary to the Minister of Supply, John Wilmot, from 1946 to 1947.  He was defeated at the 1950 general election, after catching influenza during the campaign, and was never returned to the House of Commons.

Binns was appointed as a Commissioner of the Public Works Loan Board in 1948, a role held until 1972, becoming deputy chairman of the board in 1958 and chairman in 1970. He was made a Commander of the Order of the British Empire (CBE) in the New Year Honours 1961.

Family
Binns married Daisy Graham in 1924, and they had two sons: Graham and Joseph Christopher. Graham Binns (1925–2003) was a broadcaster and arts campaigner who served for five years as chairman of the British Committee for the Restitution of the Parthenon Marbles. Another son, Joseph Binns (born 1931), was a Labour Party councillor in Greenwich who stood unsuccessfully for Parliament on three occasions: as a Labour candidate in Bromley at the 1964 general election and in his father's old constituency of Gillingham in 1966, and as a Social Democratic Party (SDP) candidate in Birmingham Edgbaston at the 1983 general election.

References

External links

1900 births
1975 deaths
Councillors in the Royal Borough of Greenwich
Labour Party (UK) MPs for English constituencies
UK MPs 1945–1950
Commanders of the Order of the British Empire
Labour Party (UK) councillors
Members of Greenwich Metropolitan Borough Council